Ballinamult is a hamlet in County Waterford situated near the border with County Tipperary.
It is in the historic Sliabh gCua district between the Comeragh and Knockmealdown Mountains.

Ballinamult Barracks
The barracks was built by 1714 as it features on a map of that date by Herman Moll and it is described as a redoubt for twenty men. It was situated on a bluff on the East bank of the Finisk River guarding access to County Tipperary. In 1918, the garrison consisted of a Sergeant and three constables. Later on this was increased by a party of about a dozen soldiers.

See also
 Sliabh gCua
 Touraneena

References

Townlands of County Waterford